Hartmeyer may refer to:
 Hartmeyer Ice Arena, a multi-purpose arena in Madison, Wisconsin, United States
Helen Camille Stanley Hartmeyer (born 1930), composer and violist
 Robert Hartmeyer (1874–1923), a German zoologist